James Long, Jim Long, or Jimmy Long may refer to:

Politics
 Sir James Long, 2nd Baronet (1617–1692), English politician and Royalist soldier
 Sir James Long, 5th Baronet (1682–1729), English politician
 Sir James Tylney-Long, 7th Baronet (1736–1794), English politician
 James Long (Australian politician) (1870–1932), Australian Senator
 James E. Long (1940–2009), American government figure in North Carolina
 Patrick James Long (1864–1934), American businessman and politician in Minnesota
 Jim Long (Kansas politician) (1936-1998), American politician and member of the Kansas House of Representatives

Military
 James Long (British Army officer), British Army officer of the 18th century
 James Long (filibuster) (1793–1822), American military figure

Sports
 Carl Long (born 1967 as James Carlyle Long), American stock car driver
 Jim Long (darts player) (born 1968), Canadian darts player
 Jim Long (baseball) (1862–1932), American baseball player
 Jimmy Long (footballer) (1880 – after 1907), Scottish professional footballer

Other
 J. B. Long (1903–1975), American store manager, owner, and record company talent scout
 James Long (priest) (1814–1887), Anglo-Irish priest, missionary and scholar
 James D. Long (born 1948), American author and former radio personality
 Jim Long (1943–2022), American entrepreneur in the broadcast music industry
 R. James Long (born 1938), American academic and professor of philosophy

See also
 James Leong (1929–2011), Chinese-American artist